Te tamari no atua (Polynesian for The Son of God) or The Birth is an 1896 oil on canvas painting by Paul Gauguin, now in the Neue Pinakothek in Munich. It forms a Nativity in Polynesian guise.

References

Paintings by Paul Gauguin
1896 paintings
Collection of the Neue Pinakothek
Nativity of Jesus in art